Twinkle is a free and open-source application for voice communications over Voice over IP (VoIP) protocol.

Architecture
It is designed for Linux operating systems and uses the Qt toolkit for its graphical user interface. For call signaling it employs the Session Initiation Protocol (SIP). It also features direct IP-to-IP calls. Media streams are transmitted via the Real-time Transport Protocol (RTP) which may be encrypted with the Secure Real-time Transport Protocol (SRTP) and the ZRTP security protocols.

Since version 1.3.2 (September 2008), Twinkle supports message exchange and a buddy-list feature for presence notification, showing the online-status of predefined communications partners (provider-support needed).

Supported audio formats
 G.711 A-law: 64 kbit/s payload, 8 kHz sampling rate
 G.711 μ-law: 64 kbit/s payload, 8 kHz sampling rate
 G.726: 16, 24, 32 or 40 kbit/s payload, 8 kHz sampling rate
 GSM: 13 kbit/s payload, 8 kHz sampling rate
 G.729: 8 kbit/s payload, 8 kHz sampling rate
 iLBC: 13.3 or 15.2 kbit/s payload, 8 kHz sampling rate
 Speex narrow band: 15.2 kbit/s payload, 8 kHz sampling rate
 Speex wide band: 28 kbit/s payload, 16 kHz sampling rate
 Speex ultra wide band: 36 kbit/s payload, 32 kHz sampling rate

See also

 Comparison of VoIP software
 List of SIP software
List of free and open-source software packages
 Opportunistic encryption

References

Free VoIP software
Cryptographic software
Internet privacy software
Secure communication
Software that uses Qt
KDE software